Tirawa basin is a large impact crater on Saturn's moon Rhea, at . It was glimpsed by Voyager 1 during its flyby of the moon and later photographed in greater detail by the Cassini orbiter.

The crater has a slightly elliptic outline and an elongated central peak complex suggesting it was caused by an oblique impact. Tirawa overlaps Mamaldi, a larger and more degraded basin to its southwest.

References

Impact craters on Saturn's moons
Rhea (moon)